Big Rapids High School (BRHS) is a public high school in Big Rapids, Michigan. It is the sole comprehensive high school in the Big Rapids Public Schools district, serving grades 9-12.

Demographics 
The demographic breakdown from the 612 students enrolled in 2018-19 was:

 Male - 52.1%
 Female - 47.9%
 Native American - 0.3%
 Asian - 1.3%
 Black - 4.9%
 Hispanic - 2.8%
 White - 87.9%
In addition, 40.5% of students were eligible for free or reduced-price lunch.

References

External links 

 Official website

Education in Mecosta County, Michigan
Public high schools in Michigan